Melody Hernandez is an American politician serving as a member of the Arizona House of Representatives from the 8th district. Elected in 2020, she assumed office on January 11, 2021.

Background 
Hernandez was born and raised in the East Valley region of Arizona. She works as a paramedic in Tempe, Arizona. She was also the communications director for GlobeMed, a student group at Arizona State University.

References 

Living people
Democratic Party members of the Arizona House of Representatives
Women state legislators in Arizona
People from Tempe, Arizona
Hispanic and Latino American state legislators in Arizona
Hispanic and Latino American women in politics
Year of birth missing (living people)
21st-century American politicians
21st-century American women politicians